A trophy wife is a wife who is regarded as a status symbol for the husband. The term is often used in a derogatory or disparaging way, implying that the wife in question has little personal merit besides her physical attractiveness, requires substantial expense for maintaining her appearance, is often unintelligent or unsophisticated, does very little of substance beyond remaining attractive, and is in some ways synonymous with the term gold digger. A trophy wife is typically relatively young and attractive, and may be a second, third or later wife of an older, wealthier man.  A trophy husband is the male equivalent.

History 
In his Theory of the Leisure Class (1899), Thorstein Veblen suggested that "The original reason for the seizure and appropriation of women seems to have been their usefulness as trophies." The term's more recent etymological origins are disputed. One claim is that "trophy wife" originally appeared in a 1950 issue of The Economist newspaper, referring to the historical practice of warriors capturing the most beautiful women during battle to bring home as wives. William Safire claimed that the term "trophy wife" was coined by Julie Connelly, a senior editor of Fortune magazine, in a cover story in the issue of August 28, 1989, and immediately entered common usage. Author Tom Wolfe, himself often credited with coining the term, disclaimed it in a talk given at Brown University in 1996, wherein he also credited Fortune magazine in an article published "not that long ago". Many sources claim the term was coined earlier (for example, the Online Etymology Dictionary cites 1984), but easy online access to William Safire's article about the term has led many (such as the Oxford English Dictionary) to believe that August 28, 1989, was its first use. However, the idiom is found in passing in a quote in a 1965 publication, apparently referring to the wife of Bernie Madoff. The 1994 marriage of former Playboy Playmate Anna Nicole Smith to oil billionaire J. Howard Marshall was widely followed by the US mass media as an extreme example of this concept. At the time of their marriage, he was 89 years old and she was 26.

Elizabeth McClintock, a sociologist at the University of Notre Dame, believes the phenomenon in modern society is less common than other research suggests.

See also 

 Age disparity in sexual relationships
 Conspicuous consumption
 How to Marry a Millionaire
 The Millionaire Matchmaker
 Sexual capital
 Sugar baby
 WAGs
 Who Wants to Marry a Multi-Millionaire?

References

External links 

 The New Trophy Wife | HuffPost Women Book citation, power couples are the "in" thing.
 T3 magazine in a review of the Motorola luxury "Aura" mobile phone model: "We think it’s best to think of the AURA as the trophy-wife of the phone world, it’s great to look at and bring to social occasions, but that’s about it." 
 End of the Century | C-SPAN.org End of the Century. C-SPAN, lecture at Brown University, April 17, 1996. "Now I have sometimes been credited with coining the term to try the words not true. It was coined by Fortune magazine in a brilliant piece not that long ago..."

Wives
Pejorative terms for women
Sexuality and age
Stereotypes of women
Narcissism